The Mission sui iuris (for a while Apostolic Prefecture) of Syria and Cilicia was a Latin Catholic pre-diocesan missionary jurisdiction in neighboring regions of Syria, Iraq and initially Anatolia.

History 
 Established in 1628 as Mission sui juris of Syria and Cilicia, on Ottoman territories in the Ancient regions of (As) Syria and Cilicia, without formal predecessor jurisdiction.
 Promoted in 1817 as Apostolic Prefecture of Syria and Cilicia.
 Lost on 1842.08.30 its territory in present Turkey to establish the Apostolic Prefecture of Mardin.
 Demoted in 1896, back to Independent Mission sui juris of Syria and Cilicia.
 Suppressed in 1953, without formal successor jurisdiction.

Ordinaries 
(all Roman Rite and Western Latin missionaries)

Ecclesiastical Superiors of Syria and Cilicia 
 first incumbents unavailable

Apostolic Prefects of Syria and Cilicia 
 Father Angelico da Loreto (1817 – 1829)
 Francesco da Ploaghe (1829 – 1834)
 Modesto da Onano (1834 – 1841)
 Giuseppe da Genova (1841 – 1844)
 Emanuele della Croce (1883 – 1896)

Ecclesiastical Superiors of Syria and Cilicia 
 Marcellino da Vallarsa (1896 – 1902)
 Girolamo da Lione, Capuchin Friars Minor (O.F.M. Cap.) (1903.03.07 – death 1946)

See also 
 List of Catholic dioceses in Syria

References

External links 
 GCatholic 

Missions sui iuris
Former Roman Catholic dioceses in Asia
1620s establishments in Ottoman Syria